Waleed Al-Hammadi (born 27 June 2000) is a Comorian footballer who plays as a forward for Emirati club Al-Wasl.

Personal life
Although born in the United Arab Emirates, he is not an Emirati citizen because of his bidoon condition and has received a Comorian passport instead, despite having no family connections to the East African nation. He is not eligible to play for the Comoros national team, according FIFA eligibility rules.

Career statistics

Notes

References

2000 births
Living people
Stateless people
Naturalized citizens of Comoros
Comorian footballers
Association football forwards
Al-Wasl F.C. players
UAE Pro League players